Cooljarloo, also known as Cooljarloo Well, is a location in Western Australia. It is located at 30°39'S 115°22'E, around 170 kilometres north of Perth, and about ten kilometres north of Cataby. It is mostly known as the location of a major mineral sands deposit mined by the Tiwest Joint Venture.

References

External links
 Google Map of Cooljarloo

Wheatbelt (Western Australia)